Al-Shorta Sports Club is an Iraqi sports club based in Al-Rusafa, Baghdad. It has teams in 17 different sports, more than any other Iraqi club, and the best known section of the club is the football team, whose origins date back to 1932. In 1974, following the Iraq Football Association's decision to implement a clubs-only policy for domestic competitions, Al-Shorta were established as a sports club.

Al-Shorta are one of Iraq's most successful clubs and are the current Iraqi Premier League champions, having won their fifth title in the 2021–22 season. Al-Shorta were crowned the inaugural Arab Club Champions Cup winners in 1982 and are one of only two Iraqi clubs to have won the tournament. Al-Shorta have reached the final of the Iraq FA Cup on five occasions without success, but are joint-record winners of the Iraqi Elite Cup having become the first team to win the trophy three consecutive times.

Al-Shorta hold numerous Iraqi Premier League records, including the joint-longest unbeaten run (39), the most consecutive wins in a season (11) and the most consecutive games scored in (37). In the 2021–22 season, Al-Shorta set records for the earliest league title win (seven rounds remaining) and the largest title-winning margin (21 points), and also became the first club to beat all other teams in a 20-team season and the first club to win all Baghdad derbies home and away in one season.

History
The first Al-Shorta (Police) football team in Baghdad was formed in 1932, participating in the second edition of the Prince Ghazi Cup in the 1932–33 season. The team's first trophy came in 1938, when they won the Taha Al-Hashimi Cup. The team became known as Madaris Al-Shorta (Police Schools) after a new Police team called Al-Quwa Al-Siyara (Mobile Force) was later formed.

For the inaugural Baghdad league season in 1948–49, it was decided that a Police select team would play in the top-flight. The Police select team (Montakhab Al-Shorta) were relegated from the top-flight that season, and therefore competed in the second division in the 1949–50 season. In the 1950–51 season, Madaris Al-Shorta entered the newly-formed third division and Al-Quwa Al-Siyara competed in the second tier instead of the Police select team, and the two teams were both leading their respective divisions before the season was abandoned.

From the 1951–52 season, Madaris Al-Shorta and Al-Quwa Al-Siyara combined to form the Police select 'A' and 'B' teams to compete in the region's top-flight and second division respectively. Montakhab Al-Shorta 'A' finished as runners-up of the top-flight in 1957–58, while Montakhab Al-Shorta 'B' finished as runners-up of the second division in 1958–59. In 1960, the Police Games Committee was formed to control Police sports in Iraq, and they decided to expand the Police force's sporting activities for the 1960–61 season. Al-Quwa Al-Siyara re-entered the IFA's football pyramid as an individual team, joining the regional second division along with newly-formed Police teams Aliyat Al-Shorta and Shortat Al-Najda, while the Police select 'A' and 'B' teams continued to compete in the top-flight and second division respectively. After finishing as Iraq Central FA League runners-up again in 1960–61, Montakhab Al-Shorta 'A' won the league title for the first time in the 1962–63 season.

At the end of that season, Aliyat Al-Shorta secured promotion to the top-flight, meaning there were two Police teams in the top division. As a result, Madaris Al-Shorta re-entered the IFA's football pyramid in place of the Police select 'A' team to compete in the top-flight from the 1963–64 season, while the Police select 'B' team were disbanded. From this point, the Police select team would only compete in the Republic Championship and in matches against visiting foreign teams. Formed from the best players of the individual Police teams, the Police select team (Montakhab Al-Shorta) won the Republic Championship in both 1968 and 1969. The select team was led by the coach of Aliyat Al-Shorta, Mohammed Najeeb Kaban, and included many of the star players from Aliyat Al-Shorta, a team that went on to win four league titles and reach the final of the 1971 Asian Champion Club Tournament where they refused to face Israeli side Maccabi Tel Aviv.

In 1974, the Iraq Football Association (IFA) decided to implement a clubs-only policy for domestic competitions, forming the Iraqi National Clubs First Division which was only open to clubs and not institute-representative teams such as the individual Police teams. With the IFA dictating that only a single club would be allowed to represent the Police in the new top-flight, Al-Shorta Sports Club was established on 18 August 1974 by the Iraqi Olympic Committee, being attached to the Ministry of Interior. The Police Games Directorate, which controlled Police sports in Iraq, were strongly opposed to the IFA's new clubs-only policy and decided to field a team of amateurs for Al-Shorta to compete in the inaugural 1974–75 season in protest. After suffering heavy defeats in their first two games, the amateur players were replaced by players from the Shortat Al-Najda and Kuliyat Al-Shorta teams, before ten Aliyat Al-Shorta players joined the team for the 1975–76 season which led to an improved third-place finish. In 1976, Al-Shorta won the first of three Arab Police Championships while representing the Iraq Police team, with further titles coming in 1978 and 1985. Al-Shorta won their first national league title in the 1979–80 season, finishing ahead of rivals Al-Zawraa on goal difference under the leadership of former player Douglas Aziz. This qualified them for the inaugural Arab Club Champions Cup in 1981–82, and Al-Shorta became the first ever Arab champions with a 4–2 aggregate win over Al-Nejmeh in the final.

In 1983, the club changed their name to Qiwa Al-Amn Al-Dakhili (Internal Security Forces) while Iraq was at war; that name only lasted for one season before they returned to the name Al-Shorta. On 23 December 1990, Al-Shorta played their first match at their new Al-Shorta Stadium, which was built with the help of volunteers and club workers, beating Al-Tijara 3–2. In the 1993–94 season, Al-Shorta striker Younis Abid Ali scored 36 league goals which remains an Iraqi record for most goals scored by a player in one league season.

There were three contenders for the 1997–98 Iraqi Premier League title going into the final day of the season; Al-Quwa Al-Jawiya were on top of the league with Al-Shorta in second and Al-Zawraa third. Al-Quwa Al-Jawiya were playing Al-Zawraa at the same time as Al-Shorta were playing Al-Sulaikh. Al-Shorta were 2–1 down to Al-Sulaikh before an 84th-minute goal from Mufeed Assem and a 91st-minute penalty kick from league top scorer Mahmoud Majeed earned a dramatic 3–2 victory, which was enough to overtake Al-Quwa Al-Jawiya (who had drawn 1–1 with Al-Zawraa) and achieve their second Premier League title and first for eighteen years. In the process, Al-Shorta broke the Iraqi records for most consecutive wins in a league season (11) and most consecutive league games scored in (37). That season also saw them reach the quarter-finals of the Asian Cup Winners' Cup, earning wins over Al-Seeb and Bargh Shiraz before being eliminated in the quarter-final.

Al-Shorta reached the quarter-finals of the 1999–2000 Asian Club Championship before making history by becoming the first club to win the Iraqi Elite Cup three times in a row, winning the trophy in 2000, 2001 and 2002. They were also in the lead of the 2002–03 league competition before it was cancelled due to the Iraq War. In April 2003, the club's former goalkeeper and captain Raad Hammoudi became Al-Shorta's president and he saved the club from bankruptcy after the war. Al-Shorta participated in the 2003 edition of the Arab Club Champions Cup and the 2004 and 2005 editions of the AFC Champions League but were knocked out in the group stage each time.

After an unstable post-war period which culminated in a relegation battle in the 2010–11 season, Al-Shorta returned to the top of Iraqi football in the 2012–13 season, securing their third Iraqi Premier League title with a final-day 3–0 victory over rivals Al-Talaba at Al-Shaab Stadium. Al-Shorta finished in first place in the Premier League in 2013–14 under Brazilian coach Lorival Santos but the season was ended prematurely due to the worsening war situation in the country. Al-Shorta also appeared in the 2014 AFC Champions League qualifiers, losing 1–0 to Al-Kuwait, and they were eliminated from the group stage and round of 16 at the 2014 and 2015 AFC Cups respectively. Al-Shorta won the Premier League title again in 2018–19, led by Montenegrin coach Nebojša Jovović, equalling the Iraqi record for most consecutive league games unbeaten (39) in the process. Al-Shorta won the Iraqi Super Cup for the first time in 2019 with a penalty shootout win over Al-Zawraa, before reaching the quarter-finals of the 2019–20 Arab Club Champions Cup and being eliminated from the group stages of the 2020 and 2021 AFC Champions Leagues, the former on goal difference.

Under the management of Egyptian coach Moamen Soliman, Al-Shorta enjoyed one of the best league seasons in their history in 2021–22. Al-Shorta set a record for the earliest Iraqi Premier League title win with seven rounds of the competition remaining, finishing a record 21 points clear at the top of the table, and became the first club to beat all other teams in a 20-team season and the first club to win all Baghdad derbies home and away in one season. Their tally of 91 points equalled the record for the most points in a 38-game season in Iraq. Al-Shorta went on to win the 2022 Iraqi Super Cup with a 1–0 victory over Al-Karkh.

Emblem
Al-Shorta began to wear a harp on their shirts in the 1992–93 season, after television presenter Majid Abdul-Haq coined the now-popular nickname Al-Qithara (The Harp) to refer to the club on his program Letter of the League by likening the team's attractive style of play to the tunes of a musical instrument. In 2002, laurel leaves were added to surround the harp on the shirt, with the Olympic rings added underneath to signify Al-Shorta's status as a multi-sport club.

At the start of the 2005–06 season, Al-Shorta adopted a new crest which was blue with a green outline. A harp featured in the centre with the club's year of foundation and the Iraq flag. This remained the logo for seven years until they changed to a circular white crest with a green outline in the 2012–13 season, which contained the same harp, laurel leaves and rings as before but with the addition of the club's name and year of foundation at the bottom. On 12 December 2013, before the start of 2014 AFC Champions League qualifying play-off, Al-Shorta announced the change to a new logo which was designed by Luay Abdul-Rahman, the artistic director of Al-Shorta's newspaper. The harp in the centre of the logo is gold rather than green, and gold is prevalent throughout the emblem. The club's foundation year and the Iraqi flag feature at the top and bottom respectively along with the club's name in English.

Kits

In 1958, Montakhab Al-Shorta had a yellow and brown kit as well as an all-white kit. Since 1974, Al-Shorta have mainly used green home kits, white away kits and purple third kits. However, since the 2016–17 season, Al-Shorta have worn purple as the away kit colour. In August 2020, Al-Shorta launched their own clothing brand called Qithara to manufacture kits and other apparel for the club.

Shirt sponsors
Al-Shorta's shirts have featured a number of different sponsors' logos over the years:

Supporters

Ultras Green Harp is an ultras group that was formed in 2012 at the start of the 2012–13 season and has grown to become one of Iraq's largest fan groups. It is a self-financed group that travels to both home and away matches across Iraq, providing flags and banners for fans to wave during the game. Before kickoff, the Ultras Green Harp members often hold up a large banner which can vary depending on the opposition. They are known for setting off fireworks and using flares, as well as using instruments such as drums and air horns. Another prominent fan group called Majaneen Al-Qithara was founded in 2017, while there are several other fan groups in provinces outside Baghdad.

Rivalries

Al-Shorta are one of the top four clubs in Baghdad. The club compete in Baghdad derbies with the other three big clubs in Baghdad: Al-Quwa Al-Jawiya, Al-Zawraa, and Al-Talaba. The rivalry with Al-Quwa Al-Jawiya developed during the Iraq Central FA League era while the rivalries with Al-Zawraa and Al-Talaba were born after the foundation of the Iraqi Premier League. Of the three, Al-Quwa Al-Jawiya are the most local to Al-Shorta, as their stadium is located only 500 metres away from Al-Shorta's on the opposite side of Falastin Street.

Stadiums

Al-Shorta Stadium

In their early years, Montakhab Al-Shorta played their home matches on the playing field at the team's headquarters, located on what would become Falastin Street in the early 1960s. After the establishment of the Iraqi Premier League, the club played their home games at the Local Administration Stadium in Al-Mansour and later at Al-Furusiya Stadium owned by the Ministry of Interior. In the 1980s, the club decided to build their own stadium, with construction of the four stands being overseen by president Abdul-Qadir Zeinal and work being carried out by club workers and volunteers. Al-Shorta Stadium was opened for its first match on 23 December 1990 with Al-Shorta beating Al-Tijara 3–2. The stadium was able to hold 8,634 people, while the white hall on the side of the field (named the Abid Kadhim Hall in honour of former player and manager Abid Kadhim) can hold approximately 2,000 people.

Al-Shorta Sports City Stadium
In the 2012–13 season, Al-Shorta announced plans to build a sports complex called Al-Shorta Sports City, which will include a new all-seater stadium with natural grass, a training pitch with an artificial surface and athletics tracks. The complex is being constructed by Swedish company Nordic Sport through its partner Nynord, along with Emirati company AKG Engineering. Börje Österberg, the owner of Nordic Sport, announced the initiation of construction of Al-Shorta Sports City on 20 December 2013.

On 7 January 2015, AKG Engineering released a video showing what the sports complex should look like once construction is completed. The stadium, which will have a capacity of 10,218, will have purple and green seats and the words 'Police Club' alongside the club's name in Arabic will be spelled out with white seats in the main stand, which will have a roof over it. Also at Al-Shorta Sports City will be a hotel, a club office, an indoor swimming pool with 1,500 seats, a multi-purpose closed hall with 2,500 seats, a full-quality relaxation club (with sports facilities), restaurants, theatres and a shopping centre. Construction on the stadium was suspended in December 2015 before resuming in November 2022.

Al-Shaab Stadium

Al-Shorta currently play their home matches at the historical national stadium, Al-Shaab Stadium, which is located in the same area as the club's old ground.

Players

First-team squad

Out on loan

Personnel

Technical staff

Management

Managers
In 1958, Montakhab Al-Shorta hired their first foreign manager in Palestinian coach Dennis Nasrawi. Since 1974, Al-Shorta have been coached by eight foreign managers from six countries. The first of these was Yugoslavian coach Rajko Menista who took charge of Al-Shorta from 1982 to 1983.

Since 2013, Al-Shorta have appointed two Brazilian managers (Lorival Santos and Marcos Paquetá), two Egyptian managers (Mohamed Youssef and Moamen Soliman), one Jordanian manager (Haitham Al-Shaboul, caretaker), one Montenegrin manager (Nebojša Jovović) and one Serbian manager (Aleksandar Ilić). The rest of the club's managers throughout history have been of Iraqi nationality.

Notable managers
The following managers won at least one major trophy when in charge of the team:

Honours

Major
Sports club:
Iraqi Premier League
Winners (5): 1979–80, 1997–98, 2012–13, 2018–19, 2021–22
Runners-up (2): 1978–79, 1980–81
Iraq FA Cup
Runners-up (5): 1977–78, 1995–96, 1996–97, 2001–02, 2002–03
Iraqi Elite Cup
Winners (3): 2000, 2001, 2002 (shared record)
Runners-up (1): 1997
Iraqi Super Cup
Winners (2): 2019, 2022
Runners-up (1): 1998
Arab Club Champions Cup
Winners (1): 1981–82

Select team:
Iraq Central FA League
Winners (1): 1962–63
Runners-up (2): 1957–58, 1960–61
Iraq Central FA Perseverance Cup
Runners-up (1): 1963

Minor

Sports club:
Baghdad Cup
Winners (1): 2013
Al-Quds International Championship
Winners (1): 2002
Baghdad Day Cup
Winners (1): 2000
Great Victory Championship
Winners (1): 1996
Al-Qadisiya Championship
Winners (1): 1988
President's Gold Cup
Winners (1): 1983
Select team:
Republic Championship
Winners (2): 1968, 1969
Hilla Mutasarrif Cup
Winners (1): 1957
Al-Olympi Club Cup
Winners (1): 1939
Al-Quwa Al-Jawiya Cup
Winners (1): 1939
Taha Al-Hashimi Cup
Winners (1): 1938

Records

Matches

Firsts
 First match: Al-Lasilki 1–1 Montakhab Al-Shorta, Prince Ghazi Cup, December 1932
 First Central FA League match: Al-Kuliya Al-Askariya Al-Malakiya 5–1 Montakhab Al-Shorta, 5 November 1948
 First FA Cup match: Montakhab Al-Shorta awd. (w/o) Kuliyat Al-Huqooq, first round, January 1949
 First Premier League match: Al-Muwasalat 3–0 Al-Shorta, 4 October 1974
 First match at Al-Shorta Stadium: Al-Shorta 3–2 Al-Tijara, Premier League, 23 December 1990

Wins
 Record win: 11–0 against Al-Samawa, FA Cup round of 32, 16 November 1998
 Record League win: 8–0 against Duhok, Premier League, 18 October 2002
 Record League qualifying win: 10–1 against Al-Hudood, 25 September 2000
 Record Elite Cup win: 7–1 against Salahaddin, group stage, 5 December 2000
 Record win in an AFC competition: 5–0 against Al-Wahda, Asian Club Championship second round, 18 November 1999
 Record win in an UAFA competition: 5–0 against FC Nouadhibou, Arab Club Champions Cup second round, 25 November 2019
 Most goals scored in one half of a win: 10, in a 10–1 win against Al-Bahri, FA Cup round of 16, 14 December 1998

Defeats
 Record defeat: 0–11 against Al-Naqil, Premier League, 12 October 1974
 Record FA Cup defeat: 0–4 against Al-Zawraa, quarter-final, 1977–78
 Record Elite Cup defeat: 0–6 against Al-Quwa Al-Jawiya, group stage, February 1996
 Record defeat in an AFC competition: 0–4 against FK Köpetdag Aşgabat, Asian Cup Winners' Cup quarter-final, 13 February 1998
 Record defeat in an UAFA competition: 0–6 against Al-Shabab, Arab Club Champions Cup quarter-final, 23 December 2019

Consecutive results
 Record consecutive League wins: 11, Premier League, from 13 March 1998 to 22 May 1998
 Record consecutive League matches scored in: 37, Premier League, from 13 October 1997 to 13 November 1998
 Record consecutive League defeats: 6, Premier League, from 15 July 2012 to 10 August 2012
 Record consecutive League matches without a defeat: 39, Premier League, from 21 May 2018 to 23 May 2019

Attendances
 Highest attendance: 68,000, against Al-Zawraa at Al-Shaab Stadium, Premier League, 13 December 1991

Appearances
 Youngest first-team player: Mohanad Ali, 13 years, 279 days (against Al-Talaba, Premier League, 26 March 2014)
 First international cap while a Montakhab Al-Shorta player: Ali Karim, for Iraq in 1957
 Most international caps while an Al-Shorta player: Raad Hammoudi, 104 for Iraq
 First players to play at the World Cup: Raad Hammoudi (starter) and Basim Qasim (substitute), for Iraq against Paraguay on 4 June 1986
 Most players in an Iraq starting line-up: 7
 against Kuwait on 22 December 2014
 against Bahrain on 23 December 2017
 against United Arab Emirates on 29 November 2019

Goals

 Most League goals in a season: Younis Abid Ali, 36 goals in the Premier League, 1993–94
 Most FA Cup goals in a season: Hashim Ridha, 14 goals, 1998–99
 Most goals in one League match: Ahmed Khudhair, 5 goals (against Al-Kut, Premier League, 14 June 2001)
 Most goals in one FA Cup match: Saeed Nouri, 5 goals (against Salahaddin, 16 May 1989)
 Most goals in AFC and UAFA competitions: 5
 Alaa Kadhim (3 in the Asian Cup Winners' Cup, 2 in the Asian Club Championship)
 Marwan Hussein (4 in the AFC Cup, 1 in the Arab Club Champions Cup)
 First ever goalscorer: Abid Abtou (against Al-Lasilki, Prince Ghazi Cup, November 1932)
 First Premier League top scorer: Zahrawi Jaber (1976–77)
 Most Premier League top scorer awards: Hashim Ridha, 2 (1998–99 and 2001–02)
 First foreign goalscorer: Innocent Awoa (against Al-Sinaa, Premier League, 20 October 2012)
 First foreign hat-trick scorer: Jean Michel N'Lend (against Al-Quwa Al-Jawiya, Premier League, 18 November 2012)
 First goalkeeper to score: Raad Hammoudi (against Al-Samawa, Premier League, 1975–76)
 Fastest goalscorer: 9.504 seconds, Alaa Abdul-Zahra (against Naft Al-Junoob, Premier League, 21 October 2018)

Top goalscorers
Iraqi Premier League (1974–present) matches only.

See also
Iraqi clubs in the AFC Club Competitions

References

External links
Al-Shorta SC Official Website

 
1932 establishments in Iraq
Association football clubs established in 1932
Football clubs in Iraq
Football clubs in Baghdad
Police association football clubs